Oddmund Ingvald Jensen (26 September 1928 – 6 March 2011) was a Norwegian cross-country skier and coach.

He was born in Sørfold, but represented Alvdal IL. He participated at the 1956 Winter Olympics in Cortina d'Ampezzo, in 30 and 50 km, and at the 1960 Winter Olympics in Squaw Valley. He was Norwegian champion in 50 km in 1959.

He was head coach for the Norwegian men's cross country national team from 1964 to 1978. He was responsible for the ski tracks at the 1994 Winter Olympics at Lillehammer.

Jensen died on 6 March 2011 at the age of 82.

Cross-country skiing results

Olympic Games

World Championships

References

External links

1928 births
2011 deaths
People from Sørfold
Cross-country skiers at the 1956 Winter Olympics
Cross-country skiers at the 1960 Winter Olympics
Norwegian male cross-country skiers
Olympic cross-country skiers of Norway
Norwegian cross-country skiing coaches
Norwegian Olympic coaches
Sportspeople from Nordland